Digitalis × fulva, the strawberry foxglove, is a fertile hybrid between Digitalis grandiflora and Digitalis purpurea.

Description
The erect stems rise from a semi-evergreen basal rosette of soft leaves. It has typical tall spikes of large tubular flowers. The color ranges from strawberry pink (hence the common name) to mauve. The flowering period extends from late spring to early summer. It prefers neutral or mildly acidic substrate and rich, moist and regularly watered soil, in full sun or in partial shade.

This plant, which is widely marketed in the UK under its synonym Digitalis × mertonensis, has gained the Royal Horticultural Society's Award of Garden Merit.

Synonyms
Digitalis fuscescens Kirschl., Prodr. Fl. Alsace 103. 1836, nom. illeg. non Waldst. & Kit. (1812).
Digitalis kotukovii Ivanina, Trudy Bot. Inst. Akad. Nauk S.S.S.R., Ser. 1, Fl. Sist. Vyssh. Rast. 11: 225. 1955, sine descr. lat. 
Digitalis × mertonensis B.H.Buxton & C.D.Darl., Nature 127: 94. 1931.
Digitalis obtusa Moench, Methodus (Moench) 443. 1794.
Digitalis purpureoides H.Lév., Bull. Géogr. Bot., sér. 4, 25 : 65, nom. illeg.

References

External links

 Biolib
 BBC Plant Finder

fulva
Hybrid plants